Operation Deep Cut was a raid by British Commandos during the Second World War. 
It was carried out by No. 1 Section of 5 Troop No. 1 Commando at Saint-Vaast-la-Hougue east of Cherbourg in September 1941. 

5 Troop were split up into two sections,  No 1 Section commanded by Lieutenant Scaramanga landed as planned at Saint Vaast Bay where they encountered a German Bicycle patrol which they shot up. However the Germans did manage to return fire and wounded two men.

References

Conflicts in 1941
World War II British Commando raids
1941 in France
History of Manche
Military history of Normandy
D
Amphibious operations involving the United Kingdom